The Otago Rebels was a New Zealand netball team which represented Otago in the National Bank Cup.

Otago Rebels were the first team to win the inaugural (what was then known as) Coca-Cola Cup. In 2008, the Rebels were merged with Southern Sting to compete as the Southern Steel in the trans-tasman ANZ Championship.

Former players of note for the franchise include Anna Stanley (née Rowberry), Victoria Edward, Belinda Colling, Adine Wilson (née Harper), Stephanie Bond and Anna Harrison (née Scarlett).

2007 Rebels Squad
 Dana Bond
 Hannah Broederlow - Now With Central Pulse
 Danielle Calnan
 Emily Close
 Phillipa Duncan (now Finch) - Now With Canterbury Tactix
 Demelza Fellowes (now McCloud)- Now With  [ [ Queensland Firebirds] ]
 Megan Graamans
 Katrina Grant - Now With Central Pulse
 Frances Jackways
 Anna Molineaux
 Camille O’Connor
 Lizzie Sandom
 Jodi Te Huna (now Brown)- Now With Southern Steel
 Anna Thompson - Now With Canterbury Tactix
 Jessica Tuki - Now With Waikato Bay of Plenty Magic
 Debbie White - Now With Northern Mystics
 Coach: Janine Southby

Competition Record
2007- 6th
2006- 7th 
2005- 5th 
2004- 6th
2003- 4th 
2002- 5th 
2001- 8th
2000- 5th
1999- 2nd 
1998- 1st

References
http://www.netballnz.co.nz/default.aspx?s=nbank_team_rebels

Defunct netball teams in New Zealand
National Bank Cup teams
Sports clubs established in 1998
1998 establishments in New Zealand
Sports clubs disestablished in 2007
2007 disestablishments in New Zealand
Southern Steel